The 2019 ABN AMRO World Tennis Tournament (or Rotterdam Open) was a men's tennis tournament played on indoor hard courts. It took place at the Rotterdam Ahoy arena in the Dutch city of Rotterdam, between 11 and 17 February 2019. It was the 46th edition of the Rotterdam Open, and part of the ATP Tour 500 series of the 2019 ATP Tour. The tournament also included a Men's Wheelchair Tennis Singles and Doubles draw. The wheelchair tennis event was an ITF-1 level tournament, with a total of $32,000 prize money.

Singles main-draw entrants

Seeds 

1 Rankings as of 4 February 2019.

Other entrants 
The following players received wildcards into the main draw:
  Tomáš Berdych 
  Tallon Griekspoor
  Stan Wawrinka

The following player received entry into the singles main draw using a protected ranking:
  Jo-Wilfried Tsonga

The following player received entry as a special exempt:
  Pierre-Hugues Herbert

The following players received entry from the qualifying draw:
  Thomas Fabbiano 
  Peter Gojowczyk
  Gilles Simon 
  Franko Škugor

The following players received entry as lucky losers:
  Marius Copil
  Ernests Gulbis

Withdrawals
Before the tournament
  Roberto Bautista Agut → replaced by  Marius Copil
  Marin Čilić → replaced by  Mikhail Kukushkin
  Grigor Dimitrov → replaced by  Martin Kližan
  Kyle Edmund → replaced by  Jérémy Chardy
  Richard Gasquet → replaced by  Matthew Ebden
  Nick Kyrgios → replaced by  Robin Haase
  Lucas Pouille → replaced by  Ernests Gulbis
  Alexander Zverev → replaced by  Damir Džumhur

Doubles main-draw entrants

Seeds 

1 Rankings as of February 4, 2019.

Other entrants 
The following pairs received wildcards into the doubles main draw:
  Robin Haase /  Matwé Middelkoop 
  Wesley Koolhof /  Jürgen Melzer

The following pair received entry from the qualifying draw:
  Sander Arends /  David Pel

The following pairs received entry as lucky losers:
  Nikoloz Basilashvili /  Matthew Ebden
  Austin Krajicek /  Artem Sitak

Withdrawals 
Before the tournament
  Karen Khachanov
  Lucas Pouille

During the tournament
  Philipp Kohlschreiber

Finals

Singles 

  Gaël Monfils defeated  Stan Wawrinka, 6–3, 1–6, 6–2

Doubles 

  Jérémy Chardy /  Henri Kontinen defeated  Jean-Julien Rojer /  Horia Tecău, 7–6(7–5), 7–6(7–4)

References

External links